Virginia elected its members in April 1817.

See also 
 1816 Virginia's 18th congressional district special election
 1816 Virginia's 23rd congressional district special election
 1816 and 1817 United States House of Representatives elections
 List of United States representatives from Virginia

Notes 

1817
Virginia
United States House of Representatives